Vukašin (Cyrillic script: Вукашин) is an old Slavic name of Serbian origin.  It is composed from two words: Vuk (wolf) and sin (son), so it means sin vuka (son of wolf). In some places in Croatia and Bosnia it can be found as a surname.

The name Vukašin can be found in Serbia, Montenegro, North Macedonia, Bulgaria, Republika Srpska and Croatia (used by Serbs of Croatia). During sound change phoneme S became š.

Famous people

Nobility
 Vukašin Mrnjavčević, a medieval Serbian king.

Music
 Vukašin Brajić, a Bosnian Serb pop-rock singer.

Sport
 Vukašin Tomić, a Serbian football player.
 Vukašin Aleksić, a Serbian professional basketball player.
 Vukašin Dević, a Serbian football player.
 Vukašin Višnjevac, a Serbian footballer and football manager.
 Vukašin "Vule" Trivunović, a Serbian football player.
 Vukašin Poleksić, a Montenegrin football goalkeeper.
 Vukašin Petranović, former Yugoslav football player.

Other
 Vukašin Šoškoćanin, Serbian war commander
 Vukašin Mandrapa, Serbian Orthodox saint and martyr, one of the Martyrs of Jasenovac

Places
 Vukašinovac, Serbian village near Aleksinac.

See also
Vukašinović
Vuk
Vukota
Vukan (disambiguation)

Serbian masculine given names
Slovene masculine given names
Croatian masculine given names
Macedonian masculine given names
Bulgarian masculine given names

Ukrainian masculine given names
Slavic masculine given names